Ivan Reitmayer is a Slovak professional ice hockey defenceman who played with HK SKP Poprad in the Slovak Extraliga during the 2010–11 season.

External links

Living people
HK Poprad players
Slovak ice hockey defencemen
Year of birth missing (living people)
Slovak expatriate ice hockey players in the United States
Slovak expatriate ice hockey players in Canada
Slovak expatriate sportspeople in Iceland
Expatriate ice hockey players in Iceland